Butler Cemetery may refer to:

 Camp Butler National Cemetery, in Illinois
 Butler Family Cemetery, in South Carolina
 West Farms Soldiers Cemetery, in New York

See also 

 Butler Community Mausoleum, in Indiana

Cemeteries